Between 1871 and 1944, Canadian chartered banks were authorized to issue bank notes for circulation in Canada.  In 1899, they were invested with the additional authority to issue bank notes for circulation in any British colony or possession. For several decades thereafter, the chartered banks were the only issuers of larger denominated notes for circulation in Canada, and an important source of notes for circulation in the British West Indies.  

In 1934, the newly-established Bank of Canada was given "the sole right to issue notes payable to bearer on demand". Coincident with the introduction of the new Bank of Canada notes in 1935, arrangements were made for the gradual contraction in the quantity of chartered bank notes in circulation.  As of the end of 1944, the Canadian government withdrew permission for Canadian banks to issue new notes for circulation in Canada; and by 1950, liability for all outstanding Canadian bank notes was transferred to the Bank of Canada, where such notes may still be redeemed. The total value of the notes outstanding at that time was $13,302,046.60.

Domestic issues
Notes for circulation in Canada were issued in a variety of different denominations, including 1, 2, 3, 4, 5, 10, 20, 25, 40, 50, 100, 500 and 1000 dollars. In  1871, the smallest denomination allowed was 4 dollars, which was raised to 5 dollars in 1880. 

The following is a list of banks with note-issuing privileges and the periods during which they issued notes in Canada. The end dates are the dates appearing on the last note issues, but notes may have circulated for some time after.

British West Indies issues

In the British West Indies, Canadian bank notes circulated from 1900 to 1950 alongside notes of the Colonial Bank (later, Barclays Bank) and, in some places, notes of smaller denominations issued by local authorities. 

The following is a list of the Canadian banks that issued notes for circulation in the British West Indies, together with the dates and denominations of those issues.

References

See also

 Bank of Canada
 Canadian pound
 Canadian banknote issuers
 Currencies of the British West Indies

Chartered
Banknotes of Canada